This is a list of various types of equilibrium, the condition of a system in which all competing influences are balanced.

Biology
 Equilibrioception, the sense of a balance present in human beings and animals
 Equilibrium unfolding, the process of unfolding a protein or RNA molecule by gradually changing its environment
 Genetic equilibrium, theoretical state in which a population is not evolving
 Homeostasis, the ability of an open system, especially living organisms, to regulate its internal environment
 Punctuated equilibrium, theory in evolutionary biology
 Sedimentation equilibrium, analytical ultracentrifugation method for measuring protein molecular masses in solution
 Equilibrium Theory (Island biogeography), MacArthur-Wilson theory explaining biodiversity character of ecological islands
 Osmotic equilibrium, balance between solvent flow and pressure across a membrane

Physics
 Equilibrant force, which keeps any object motionless and acts on virtually every object in the world that is not moving
 Equilibrium figures of Earth and planets (physical geodesy)
 Equilibrium mode distribution, the state of fiber optic or waveguide transmission in which the propagation mode does not vary with distance along the fiber or changes in the launch mode
 Hydrostatic equilibrium, the state of a system in which compression due to gravity is balanced by a pressure gradient force
 Hyperbolic equilibrium point, a mathematical concept in physics
 Mechanical equilibrium, the state in which the sum of the forces, and torque, on each particle of the system is zero
 Radiative equilibrium, the state where the energy radiated is balanced by the energy absorbed
 Secular equilibrium, a state of radioactive elements in which the production rate of a daughter nucleus is balanced by its own decay rate
 Thermodynamic equilibrium, the state of a thermodynamic system in which there are no net flows of matter or energy
 Isostatic equilibrium, in geology, the balance between gravitation and buoyancy of the earth's crust in the mantle

Chemistry
 Chemical equilibrium, the state in which the concentrations of the reactants and products have stopped changing in time
 Diffusive equilibrium, when the concentrations of each type of particle have stopped changing
 Thermal equilibrium, a state where an object and its surroundings cease to exchange energy in the form of heat, i.e. they are at the same temperature
 Donnan equilibrium, the distribution of ion species between two ionic solutions separated by a semipermeable membrane or boundary
 Dynamic equilibrium, the state in which two reversible processes occur at the same rate
 Equilibrium constant, a quantity characterizing a chemical equilibrium in a chemical reaction
 Partition equilibrium, a type of chromatography that is typically used in GC
 Quasistatic equilibrium, the quasi-balanced state of a thermodynamic system near to equilibrium in some sense or degree
 Schlenk equilibrium, a chemical equilibrium named after its discoverer Wilhelm Schlenk taking place in solutions of Grignard reagents
 Solubility equilibrium, any chemical equilibrium between solid and dissolved states of a compound at saturation
 Vapor–liquid equilibrium, where the rates of condensation and vapourization of a material are equal

Economics
 Competitive equilibrium, economic equilibrium when all buyers and sellers are small relative to the market
 Economic equilibrium, a condition in economics
 Equilibrium price, the price at which quantity supplied equals quantity demanded
 General equilibrium theory, a branch of theoretical microeconomics that studies multiple individual markets
 Intertemporal equilibrium, an equilibrium concept over time
 Lindahl equilibrium, a method proposed by Erik Lindahl for financing public goods
 Partial equilibrium, the equilibrium price and quantity which come from the cross of supply and demand in a competitive market
 Radner equilibrium, an economic concept defined by economist Roy Radner in the context of general equilibrium
 Recursive competitive equilibrium, an economic equilibrium concept associated with a dynamic program
 Static equilibrium (economics), the intersection of supply and demand in any market
 Sunspot equilibrium, an economic equilibrium in which non-fundamental factors affect prices or quantities
 Underemployment equilibrium, a situation in Keynesian economics with a persistent shortfall relative to full employment and potential output
 Dynamic stochastic general equilibrium, an econometric method that applies general equilibrium theory and microeconomic principles.

Game theory
 Correlated equilibrium, a solution concept in game theory that is more general than Nash equilibrium
 Nash equilibrium, the basic solution concept in game theory  
 Quasi-perfect equilibrium, a refinement of Nash Equilibrium for extensive form games due to Eric van Damme
 Sequential equilibrium, a refinement of Nash Equilibrium for games of incomplete information due to David M. Kreps and Robert Wilson
 Perfect Bayesian equilibrium, a refinement of Nash equilibrium for games of incomplete information that is simpler to use than sequential equilibrium 
 Symmetric equilibrium, an equilibrium where all players use the same strategy
 Trembling hand perfect equilibrium assumes that the players, through a "slip of the hand" or tremble, may choose unintended strategies
 Proper equilibrium due to Roger B. Myerson, where costly trembles are made with smaller probabilities

Other
 Social equilibrium, a system in which there is a dynamic working balance among its interdependent parts
 Equilibrium moisture content, the moisture content at which the wood is neither gaining nor losing moisture
 Equilibrium point, in mathematics, a constant solution to a differential equation 
 Reflective equilibrium, the state of balance or coherence among a set of beliefs arrived at by a process of deliberative mutual adjustment

External links
 Equilibrium article in Scholarpedia by Eugene Izhikevich
Equilibrium